Bijauria railway station is a small railway station in Izzatnagar railway division. Its code is BJV. It serves Bijauria and nearby villages in Bareilly district. The station consists of three platforms.

Passing trains
 Pilibhit–Bareilly City Passenger (55362)
 Bareilly City–Pilibhit Passenger (55361)
 Pilibhit–Bareilly City Passenger (55364)
 Bareilly City–Pilibhit BG Passenger (55363)
 Tanakpur–Delhi Express (14555)
 Delhi–Tanakpur Express (14556)
 Pilibhit–Bareilly City Passenger (55366)
 Bareilly City–Pilibhit Passenger (55365)
 Pilibhit–Bareilly City Passenger (55368)
 Bareilly City–Pilibhit DEMU (75305)
 Pilibhit–Bareilly City DEMU (75306)
 Bareilly City–Pilibhit Passenger (55369)

References

Izzatnagar railway division
Railway stations in Bareilly district